Falz-Fein may refer to:
 9838 Falz-Fein, a minor planet
 Eduard Theodor von Falz-Fein, a bobsledder
 Eduard von Falz-Fein (1912–2018), a Russian-born businessman, journalist, public figure and sportsman from Liechtenstein